The following is a list of semiotics terms; that is, those words used in discussion, classification, criticism, and analysis of the study of sign processes (semiosis), analogy, metaphor, signification and communication, signs and symbols. Note: in order to help the reader this page also includes terms which are not part of semiotic theory per se but which are commonly found alongside their semiotic brethren - these terms come from linguistics, literary theory and narratology.

A
Addressee (Imported from linguistic theory)

B
Biosemiotics

C
Codes
Connotation
Commutation tests

D
Decode
Denotation

E
Ecosemiotics
Encode

F
Film semiotics

G

H

I
Iconicity
Indexicality
Interpretant (Peircean semeiotic system)

J

K

L
Lexical

M
Meaning
Modality

N

Narrator (Imported term from narratology)

O

P
Paradigmatic analysis
Paradigms
Paratext (A term from narratology)

Q

R
Receiver (mathematical/transmission theory of communication)

S
Semeiotic
Semiosis
Semiosphere
Semiotics of agriculture
Semiotics of music videos
Semiotics of dress
Signs
Signified (Signifié)
Signified
Signifier (Signifiant)
Signifier
Symbol
Syntagmatic analysis
Syntagmatic structures

T
Tropes (Imported from linguistics)

U

V
Values

W

Z
Zoosemiotics

Wikipedia indexes